Consolidated High School District 230 is a public high school district headquartered in Orland Park, Illinois in the Chicago metropolitan area. It has over 8,300 students in three high schools.

Communities served by the district include all or parts of: Orland Park, Bridgeview, Hickory Hills, Oak Forest, Orland Hills, Palos Heights, Palos Hills, Palos Park, Tinley Park, Willow Springs, and Worth.

Schools
 Victor J. Andrew High School
 Carl Sandburg High School
 Amos Alonzo Stagg High School

Former schools:
 Benjamin Franklin High School - from 1993 to 1998, District 230 operated Benjamin Franklin High School, a small laboratory school enrolling approximately 150 students. Franklin was established to be a center for staff development, a catalyst for school restructuring, and an alternative to the traditional high school experience. Students from each of the district's comprehensive high schools volunteered to attend Franklin.

Feeder districts
They are:
Kirby District 140
North Palos School District 117
Orland Elementary District 135
Palos School District 118
Tinley Park Community Consolidated School District 146
Willow Springs School District 108
Worth School District 127

References

External links
 

Orland Park, Illinois
School districts in Cook County, Illinois